Emanuel Yousif Kamber is an Assyrian physics professor at Western Michigan University and was the Secretary General of the Assyrian Universal Alliance.  He was born in the small Assyrian village of Darbandokeh in Iraq.

Biography
In 1983, Emanuel Kamber earned a Ph.D. and Doctors degree in physics from University of London in England. He studies and conducts experiments involving electron capture, ionization and excitation processes in low-velocity collisions among atoms, ions and molecules. Emanuel has published over 70 widely referenced papers in scientific journals and has presented more than 90 papers at National and International Conferences on Atomic Physics. He has been a research associate at the Royal Society Research Unit, University College of Swansea in the United Kingdom & Kansas State University, and a Visiting Professor at Kansas State University. He has mentored 4 master theses and 2 Ph.D. dissertations.

See also
 Assyrian Universal Alliance

References

 WMU News: At the behest of the U.S. Department of State, Dr. Emanuel Kamber, a Western Michigan University professor of physics, has been traveling the world recently to help lay plans for a post-war Iraq.
 Zinda Magazine, 6 July 2005. Editorial: What Next For AUA? 
 "Kurdish Autonomy Proposal Threatens Iraqi Territorial Integrity"
 "Exiles Lay Groundwork For An Iraq Transition"
 "Single-Electron Capture Processes in Slow Collisions of He2+ Ions with O2, NH3, N2, and CO2," O. Abu-Haija, E. Y. Kamber, S.M. Ferguson and N. Stolterfoht, Phys. Rev. A 72 042701 (2005)
 "Competition between dissociative and nondissociative single-electron capture in He2+ -O2 collisions," E.Y. Kamber, O. Abu-Haija, and S.M. Ferguson, Physical Review A, 65 (2002) 62717.

External links
 Western Michigan University: Biography of Emanuel Kamber
 Emanuel Kamber

American politicians of Assyrian descent
Iraqi emigrants to the United States
21st-century American physicists
Living people
Year of birth missing (living people)
Iraqi physicists
Western Michigan University faculty
Iraqi Assyrian people
Alumni of Birkbeck, University of London